Team Paradise are a senior-level synchronized skating team representing Russia. Currently, they are ranked first in the world by the International Skating Union. They are three-times  (2016, 2017 and 2019) World Champions, they claimed the 2015 World Championships bronze medals, and they are the 1999-2017 Russian National Champions.

After the 2022 Russian invasion of Ukraine, the ISU banned all athletes from Russia and Belarus from events until further notice.

Competitive results (2009–17)

Competitive results (1999–2009)

References

External link 
 Team Paradise Instagram

Senior synchronized skating teams
Sports teams in Russia
World Synchronized Skating Championships medalists